Nu Aquarii (ν Aqr, ν Aquarii) is the Bayer designation for a star in the equatorial constellation of Aquarius.

With an apparent visual magnitude of 4.52, Nu Aquarii is visible to the naked eye. At an estimated age of 708 million years, it has evolved into a giant star with a spectrum that matches a stellar classification of G8 III. It has than double the mass of the Sun and has expanded to eight times the Sun's radius. At this heat, the star is glowing with the yellowish hue of a G-type star.

Together with μ Aquarii, it is Albulaan , a name derived from the Arabic term al-bulaʽān (ألبولعان), meaning "the two swallowers". This star, along with ε Aqr (Albali) and μ Aqr (Albulaan), were al Bulaʽ (البلع)—the Swallower.

References

External links
 Image Nu Aquarii
 The Constellations and Named Stars

Albulaan
201381
Aquarii, Nu
Aquarius (constellation)
G-type giants
104459
Aquarii, 013
8093
Durchmusterung objects